Aaron Kircher (born 18 October 1991) is an Austrian footballer who plays for Eliteliga Vorarlberg club VfB Hohenems.

External links
 
 

1991 births
Living people
Austrian footballers
Association football midfielders
SC Austria Lustenau players
SC Rheindorf Altach players
First Vienna FC players
FC Dornbirn 1913 players
2. Liga (Austria) players
Austrian Regionalliga players